Jubilee International Church was established in 1992 with just 7 members in Clapham, London SW4. They then purchased and modernised a former 1935 Baptist church building and moved in 2006 to the Chinbrook and the former Chinbrook Meadows areas of Grove Park. The church was part of the Assemblies of God in Great Britain, a leading Pentecostal denomination worldwide. The church had a number of branches in the UK and in several nations worldwide.

History of the building

When the Grove Park Estate was first built in the 1920s, Lewisham Council determined that it should also include a church. Mr Frederick E Pinkess who had been running a successful ‘mobile’ Sunday school in the community decided to apply for permission to get a church built. He could clearly see that the area had potential for a thriving parish. With the help of the Shaftesbury Society, which was affiliated to the Baptist Church, Mr Pinkess raised enough money to build a church which was completed in May 1935. It was a non-denominational place of worship called Grove Park Mission and served as a mercy ministry to the poor. In the 1930s and 1940s, the church had a very popular and effective outreach programme in the community especially amongst the children, which led to a thriving Sunday school. Outreaches included opening-air singing and playing hymns along the local residential streets while carrying around the heavy church organ for music. There were regular open air outreaches every Sunday afternoon and evening for many years.

In 1947, the work was connected with the Free Church movement which was of the Plymouth Brethren movement. Then from 1961, Pastor Gordon Thomson who was connected to Honor Oak Christian Fellowship became the long-term pastor of the congregation now called The Christian Fellowship. A local branch of Operation Mobilisation was also instrumental in helping with this work.

In 1987, Book Aid began to lease space in the building from The Christian Fellowship, and then in August 2005 the building was sold to Jubilee International Church who had migrated from the Clapham area. Pastor Thomson expressed the fact that they were thankful to see the church building in the hands of a new thriving congregation. He and his wife both died within a month of each other in 2007.

Opposition 

The new church came into the media spotlight in the summer of 2006 following serious controversy with local residents in Grove Park and heated dialogues with the local council, London Borough of Lewisham regarding planning consent. Following a favourable decision by the council regarding planning usage, this issue eventually culminated in racist arson attacks against the church and continuing minor attacks and opposition for almost two years. The proverbial dust settled after about 18 months.

References

External links 
 JIC website
 Assemblies of God in Great Britain
 Anger at Council's U-turn on church. News Shopper. 20 June 2006
 Church prayer answered. News Shopper. 18 July 2006
 Church damaged in racist arson attack. This is Local London. 16 August 2006 
 Church damaged in racist arson attack. Wandsworth Guardian. 16 August 2006

Churches in the London Borough of Lewisham
Pentecostal churches in London